Fighting Force 2 is a beat 'em up/shooter video game, the sequel to 1997's Fighting Force. The game was released for the PlayStation and Dreamcast and was developed by Core Design and published by Eidos Interactive.

Overview
Set in the not-too-distant future, human cloning has become a reality but has been banned by international treaty. The Knackmiche Corporation is suspected of researching cloning, and mercenary Hawk Manson is sent on a covert mission to investigate.

It features hand-to-hand and weapons combat like the original game but does not include multiplayer support. While it includes more weapons and larger levels than its predecessor, the sequel includes only one playable character this time around: Hawk Manson.

Reception

Unlike its predecessor which received some decent reviews, Fighting Force 2 was not very successful, and received mixed reviews on both platforms according to the review aggregation website GameRankings. Blake Fischer of NextGen said in its February 2000 issue that the PlayStation version was "solid, but ultimately uninspiring. You'll burn out on this game long before you beat it". An issue later, Jeff Lundrigan of the same magazine called the Dreamcast version "the very definition of a two-star game: 'Perhaps competent; certainly uninspired'".

Due to its lackluster sales and a less-than-pleased fanbase, the series eventually ended. A third game was in development, but was cancelled when Core Design closed down.

References

External links

1999 video games
Beat 'em ups
Core Design games
Cyberpunk video games
Dreamcast games
Dystopian video games
Eidos Interactive games
PlayStation (console) games
PlayStation Network games
Side-scrolling beat 'em ups
Shooter video games
Video game sequels
Video games about cloning
Video games set in Antarctica
Video games set in California
Video games set in San Francisco
Video games set in Osaka
Video games about zombies
Video games set in Philadelphia
Video games set in Texas
Video games set in Tokyo
Video games developed in the United Kingdom